The Torrent is a lost 1924 American silent melodrama film directed by A. P. Younger and William Doner, from a screenplay by A. P. Younger. The film stars William Fairbanks, Ora Carew, and Frank Elliott.

Plot summary

Cast

References

External links
 
 
 
 

American black-and-white films
1924 drama films
Silent American drama films
American silent feature films
Melodrama films
1920s English-language films
1920s American films